Affoltern is a quarter in the district 11 in Zürich, located in the Glatt Valley (German: Glattal).

History and demographics 

Affoltern was first mentioned in 870 as Affaltrahe, and in the 9th century it was reigned by the St. Gallen Abbey, in the 12th/13th century by the House of Regensberg who built their ancestral seat Altburg nearby, followed in 1468 by the city of Zürich as part of the Obervogtei Regensberg ending in 1798. Affoltern was then after a municipality of its own, having been incorporated into the city Zürich in 1934. As today, Affoltern consists of the former settlements (Fraktionen) Ober- und Unter-Affoltern.

The quarter has a population of 22'972 (2010) distributed on an area of 6.04 km2, and is separated by the Käferberg from the inner city.

Culture 
The bath/lido Strandbad Katzensee is very popular.

Transportation 
Zürich Affoltern railway station is a stop of the S-Bahn Zürich on the line S6.

Climate

References 

 Präsidialdepartement der Stadt Zürich, Statistik Stadt Zürich: Quartierspiegel Affoltern. Zürich 2011 (PDF; 9 MB)

External links 

 Quartierverein Affoltern
 

District 11 of Zürich
Former municipalities of the canton of Zürich